Korowai (Kolufaup) is a Trans-New-Guinean language spoken in South Papua, Indonesia.  It is spoken by the Korowai people who live along the Becking River.

Notes

References
 The Korowai of Irian Jaya: Their Language in Its Cultural Context (Oxford Studies in Anthropological Linguistics, 9) by Gerrit J. Van Enk & Lourens de Vries.
Hughes, Jock. 2009. Upper Digul Survey. SIL International.

Languages of western New Guinea
Becking–Dawi languages